You Made a Fool of Death with Your Beauty is a 2022 romance novel by Nigerian writer Akwaeke Emezi. It is Emezi's first romance novel, third adult novel and it follows Feyi Adekola, a Nigerian American visual artist as she heals from the trauma of widowhood and finds new love.

Background 
The novel is Emezi's first romance novel and they stated that the novel was partly inspired by the Florence + the Machine song "Hunger". Emezi pulled the title of the book from the song lyrics after trying different alternatives name for the novel which they felt didn't fit. While writing the novel, they did not want it to fall under the regular trope of romance novels and instead made it an illicit love triangle. Also, Emezi wrote the novel to have a queer gaze and also feature a supportive queer friendship. They deviated from the normal heterosexual romance trope and explore made it a queer romance with the main characters Feyi and Alim being bisexual and Joy, who is a lesbian. Feyi's art in the novel is also based on Emezi's experience as a visual artist.

Reception 
The book received generally positive critical acclaim and reception. It was the most anticipated book of 2022 by multiple media outlets including Vogue, Thrillist, Essence, The Washington Post and Vulture. Writing for Vogue, Emma Specter praised the writing stating that "Emezi can write a love story like no other".

The New York Times Book Review praised the novel calling it "[A]n unabashed ode to living with, and despite, pain and mortality…and it could appeal especially to people who, living through an isolating pandemic that has accelerated loss, hunger for more joie de vivre.  A review from PopSugar called the novel "A riveting and emotional exploration of grief and taking a second chance on love."
Publishers Weekly noted that it "...is sure to tug at readers’ heartstrings."

Adaptation
In April 2021, Deadline Hollywood announced that Amazon Studios won the right to adapt You Made a Fool of Death with Your Beauty into a feature film. It was purchased in a high six figure deal which Deadline called the biggest book deal of the year so far. Michael B. Jordan’s Outlier Society will develop it alongside Elizabeth Raposo. Emezi will serve as the executive producer.

References 
 

2022 Nigerian novels
Novels set in Brooklyn
2020s LGBT novels
Nigerian LGBT novels
Novels by Akwaeke Emezi
Contemporary romance novels
Novels with bisexual themes
Atria Publishing Group books